PNS Zulfiqar was a  of the Pakistan Navy, originally built for the Royal Navy during the Second World War as HMS Deveron. Zulfiqar was damaged beyond repair by friendly fire from aircraft of the Pakistan Air Force (PAF) which mistook her for a missile boat of the Indian Navy during the Indo-Pakistani War of 1971.

History
Following service in the Second World War, Deveron was transferred to the Royal Indian Navy in 1945 and was renamed HMIS Dhanush. On Partition she was transferred to the Royal Pakistan Navy and converted into a survey vessel, as well as being renamed Zulfiqar. The conversion meant the rear 4-inch gun was removed. Her pennant number was changed from F265 to 262 in 1963.

In June 1953 she attended the Coronation Review of Queen Elizabeth II at Spithead.

She was decommissioned in 1983.

Operation Trident

 
The Pakistan Navy, on high alert as a result of the first missile attack (Ops: Trident), raised a number of false alarms in the ensuing days about the presence of Indian Navy vessels off Karachi. One such false alarm was raised by a PIA Fokker Friendship reconnaissance aircraft carrying naval observers, in the early hours of 6 December 1971 which reported a Pakistan Navy frigate as a missile boat of the Indian Navy, in the area west of Cape Monze on the Pakistani coast.

The Pakistan Air Force, giving air support to the Pakistan Navy at Karachi, had received the report. Clearance was given to attack by Cdre. A. W. Bhombal from the Pakistan Navy.

At 0645 hrs, the F-86 jets were scrambled which strafed the vessel before it was identified as the Pakistan Navy's own frigate Zulfiqar. During the aerial attack Zulfiqar was hit by more than 900 rounds of .50 caliber ammunition, killing several officers and men, with many more injured. The air attack on Zulfiqar was halted after frantic efforts by her crew to identify their ship as a Pakistan Navy vessel finally succeeded.

The incident was monitored by the Indian Navy on radio and revealed the following points: 
 First, the incorrect identification and attack happened in spite of Zulfiqars being anchored. This showed that PAF pilots could not clearly distinguish a frigate from a missile boat.
 Second, it showed the fear that the Pakistan Navy had of India's missile boats.

This incident vindicated the decision to proceed with second missile attacks (Ops: Python), which was being debated after a PAF attack on Okha on the night of 5/6 December 1971. It also prompted the Pakistan Navy to withdraw the Pakistan combat fleet closer to the Pakistan's shore.

The shelling of Zulfiqar was a matter of interservice conflict between the Navy and the Air Force, in which the Air Force alleged the Navy was disregarding the "sense of camaraderie". Responding to this incident, the PAF contested the claims made by the Indian Navy by holding Cdre. Bhombal responsible for giving the clearance when the Air Force's Board of Inquiry reportedly quoted: "[the] Navy unfortunately seems to have forgotten the sense of camaraderie and air support which was provided from the scarce resources with readiness."

See also 

 PNS Muhafiz
 
 Indo-Pakistani War of 1971
 Timeline of the Bangladesh Liberation War
 Military plans of the Bangladesh Liberation War
 Mitro Bahini order of battle
 Pakistan Army order of battle, December 1971
 Evolution of Pakistan Eastern Command plan
 Operation Searchlight
 Indo-Pakistani wars and conflicts
 Military history of India
 List of military disasters
 List of wars involving India

References

Publications
 

 

1943 ships
India–Pakistan military relations
River-class frigates of the Pakistan Navy
Indo-Pakistani War of 1971
Friendly fire incidents